Baron Luitbert Alexander George Lionel Alphons von Pawel-Rammingen,  (German: Luitbert Alexander Georg Lionel Alfons Freiherr von Pawel-Rammingen; 27 July 1843 – 20 November 1932) was a German-born nobleman who became a naturalised British subject in 1880 when he married Princess Frederica of Hanover.

Life 

Pawel-Rammingen was born on 27 July 1843, the eldest son of Karl Julius August Plato Emil, Baron von Pawel-Rammingen (1807–1886) and his wife Luitgarde von Friesen (b. 1819); he had an elder sister, Anna (b. 1842) who married  in 1862, and a younger brother, Baron Paul Julius August Plato Sylvester Albert (b. 1851; known commonly as Albert). He succeeded his father to become 2nd Baron in 1886.

On 24 April 1880, Pawel-Rammingen married Princess Frederica Sophia Maria, daughter of King George V of Hanover at St George's Chapel, Windsor; he became a naturalised British Subject by Act of Parliament on 19 March 1880 (she was also a British princess). In the same year, he was appointed a Knight Commander of the Order of the Bath (KCB) and in 1897, Queen Victoria also appointed him a Knight Commander of the Royal Victorian Order (KCVO). He was also appointed a Knight Commander of the Order of Hanover (KCH). In the United Kingdom, he was Honorary Colonel of the 6th Battalion of the Essex Regiment. He became a widower in 1926, and died on 20 November 1932.

References 

1843 births
1932 deaths
Barons of Germany
Knights Commander of the Order of the Bath
Knights Commander of the Royal Victorian Order
Naturalised citizens of the United Kingdom